Dong District is a district of Panzhihua, Sichuan province, China.

References

External links

Districts of Sichuan
Panzhihua